The Serres revolutionary district (Macedonian/Bulgarian: Серски револуционерен округ/Серски революционен окръг) was an organizational grouping of the Internal Macedonian Revolutionary Organization. The most famous leader of the group was Yane Sandanski. This rebel group had its headquarters in Serres.

Serres